Zhang Ruijie (born 8 January 2001) is a Chinese footballer currently playing as a midfielder for Hubei Istar.

Career statistics

Club
.

Notes

References

2001 births
Living people
Chinese footballers
Association football midfielders
Atlético Madrid footballers
Gondomar S.C. players
Hubei Istar F.C. players
Chinese expatriate footballers
Chinese expatriate sportspeople in Spain
Expatriate footballers in Spain
Chinese expatriate sportspeople in Portugal
Expatriate footballers in Portugal